Victoria "Torri" Huske (Chinese given name: 简爱, born December 7, 2002) is an American swimmer. She is the current World Champion in the long-course meters (LCM) 100M butterfly. In addition, she is the current American record holder in both the 100-meter butterfly and the LC 50M butterfly. At the 2022 Fina World Swimming Championships in Budapest, Hungary, Huske, just 19, became one of only four American women in history to win six medals (three gold and three bronze) at a World Championships. 

At 18 she competed at the 2020 Summer Olympics, winning a silver medal in the 4×100-meter medley relay, swimming the butterfly leg of the relay in the final.   She also  placed fourth in the 100-meter butterfly, and fifth in the 4×100-meter mixed medley relay where she also swam butterfly on the finals relay.  At the 2019 World Junior championships, she won five gold medals and one silver medal. She won two gold medals and one silver medal in relay events at the 2021 World Short Course Championships.

Early life and education
Huske is from Arlington, Virginia. Her mother, Ying, is currently an IT Professional.  Ying was an architect from Guangzhou, China before emigrating to the United States in 1991.  Her father is Jim Huske. Huske's mother would take Huske to swim when she was a young girl. At six, she began swimming with the Arlington Aquatic Club (AAC).  In her first two years with AAC, she wore a wetsuit for her swim practice as she was always cold in the water. 

Swimming had not been Huske's first choice sport but she came to realize that her performance increased as she committed more time to training. Stiles said Huske was one of their most committed members who would not shirk arduous training exercises.

Huske attended and swam for Yorktown High School in Arlington County. In July 2021, Huske was announced as one of the 2020–2021 high school All-American swimmer by the National Interscholastic Swimming Coaches Association(NISCA). In September 2021, USA Swimming named Huske as one of the recipients of Scholastic All-American honors for the 2020–2021 high school season, it was her fourth year receiving the honor.

Huske started attending Stanford University in autumn 2021, where she competes collegiately as part of the Stanford Cardinal. She committed verbally to swimming for Stanford in June 2020, a little over a year in advance of arriving on campus in 2021.

Career 
Before attending college, Huske swam with the Arlington Aquatic Club (AAC) in Arlington, Virginia for her entire swim career (2008-2020).  From 2017-2021 she was coached by Evan Stiles of AAC.

High School Swimming (2017-2021) 
Torri attended Yorktown High School in Arlington Virginia from 2017-2021.  While at high school, she was coached by Torey Ortmayer  While in high school her team finished first once (2021), second twice (2018-2020) and third in the Virginia State High School League (VHSL) Class 6 High School Swimming and Diving Championships.  She served as a Captain on the 2021 state championship team.

At the VHSL State Championship Meet during her senior year Huske set the National High School Record in the 200 Short Course Yards (SCY) Individual Medley (IM) with a time of 1:53.73, shaving a tenth of a second from the record previously held by Dagney Knutson which had stood since 2009.  Less than twenty-seven minutes, Huske broke her second National High School Record of the meet when she won the 100 (SCY) butterfly with a time of 49.95 becoming the first woman ever to go under 50 seconds in a high school competition.  With that swim Huske re-claimed the overall national high school record taking down Claire Curzan’s mark of 50.35 from 2020. In addition, with the swim, she also set the 17-18 National Age Group record of 50.19 previously set by Olivia Bray in 2019.  During that meet she also came within 6/100’s of a second from a third National High School Record when she led off the 4x50 Freestyle relay with a relay split of 21.65, which was just off the national public record of 21.59 set by Gretchen Walsh in 2020.

Over the course of her high school career set six All-time Virginia State (SCY) records (50 Freestyle, 100 Freestyle, 200 Freestyle, 100 Butterfly, 200 individual medley and the 4x50 Medley Relay).  In addition, Huske won fifteen VHSL Class 6 High School State Championships (Eight individual and seven relay).  By the end of her high school career, she had been named a 29-time NISCA All-American.

In 2022 Torri became the youngest member ever inducted into the Yorktown High School Hall of Fame.

2018 
As a 15 year old, Huske finished fifth in the 50m butterfly in the 2018 Phillips 66 LC National Championships in Irvine, CA with a time of 26.81. During the meet she also finished 19th in the 50m freestyle (25.43), 62nd in the 200M individual medley (2:18.99), 71st in the 200m butterfly (2:17.50), and she was disqualified in finals for an illegal turn after going 1:00.00 in finals after finishing 31st in prelims with at time of 1:00.14.  Later that year at the 2018 Winter LC National Championships in Greensboro, NC Huske finished 3rd in the 100m butterfly with a time of 59.27.  In addition, during that meet she also finished 6th in the 200m individual medley (2:16.83), 7th in the 50m freestyle (25.42), 10th in the 100m freestyle (56.29), and 20th in the 200m butterfly (2:16.50).

2019 
At the 2019 US National Championships in Stanford, California, Huske broke the 38-year-old National Age Group record in the 100m butterfly for the girls 15–16 age group with a time of 57.80 seconds, which was 0.13 seconds faster than the previous record of 57.93 seconds set by Mary Meagher in 1981.

2019 World Junior Championships

In August 2019, Huske won six medals at the 2019 World Junior Championships in Budapest, Hungary, five of which were gold medals and one of which was a silver medal. On August 21, Huske won a gold medal in the mixed 4×100m medley relay, swimming the butterfly leg of the relay in 58.04 seconds and helping the relay finish in a new world junior record and Championships record time of 3:44.84. The next day, Huske won a silver medal in the 100m freestyle with a time of 54.54 seconds in the final that was 8-tenths of a second behind gold medalist and fellow American Gretchen Walsh. In the final of the 50-meter butterfly on August 23, Huske finished ahead of American teammate Claire Curzan, who won the bronze medal, to win the gold medal with a time of 25.70 seconds. Huske won her fourth medal of the Championships on August 24 in the 4×100m freestyle relay, splitting a 54.50 for the second leg to help the relay win the gold medal in a time of 3:37.61. On August 25, the final day of the Championships, Huske won the gold medal in the 100m butterfly with a time of 57.71 seconds, breaking her own National Age Group record in the event. For her sixth medal, Huske won a gold medal in the 4×100m medley relay, swimming the butterfly leg of the relay in 57.86 seconds and contributing to the total time of 3:59.13.

The day before she turned sixteen, Huske won LC 100M Butterfly at the Toyota U.S. Open Winter National Championships in Atlanta, GA with a LCM time of 57.48.

Huske's swims throughout the 2019 year earned her the Swammy Award from SwimSwam for "Age Group Swimmer of the Year" for the girls 15–16 age group.

2020 
In November of 2020, the Toyota US Open National Championships meet took place in nine locations due to COVID-19 and all races were timed finals (no prelims or semi-finals).   Finishing times were compiled across all the locations and places were awarded. Huske swam at the Richmond, VA location and across all locations finished 1st in the 100m freestyle with a time of 54.04. In addition, Huske also finished 2nd in the 100m butterfly (57.36), 2nd in the 200m individual medley (2:11.18), 7th in the 200m butterfly (2:14.03), 9th in the 50m free (25.34),  and 28th in the 100m backstroke (1:03.25).

2021

2020 US Olympic Trials 
At the 2020 U.S. Olympic Team Trials in Omaha, Nebraska, Huske swum a new Americas record, American record, US Open record, and Championships record time of 55.78 seconds in the 100m butterfly semifinals. Her new American record broke the record of 55.98 seconds set at the 2012 Summer Olympics by Dana Vollmer. The next day, June 14, Huske broke her own Americas, American, US Open, and Championships records from the day before, setting the new records in the final of the 100m butterfly at 55.66 seconds and swimming the third fastest performance in the event to date. Huske qualified for a spot on the 2020 USA Olympic Team, a noted accomplishment considering she was only able to train in a long course meters swimming pool once a week leading up to the Olympic Trials.   During the meet Huske swam more races than any other women.  In addition to the 100m butterfly, she also placed third in the 50m freestyle with a time of 24.46 and fourth in the 200m individual medley with a time of 2:10.38.  Huske also qualified for Semi-Finals in the 100m freestyle (placing 10 overall) and the 200m freestyle (placing 11th overall).

Following her performances at the US Olympic Trials, national newspaper USA Today highlighted Huske as one of their "10 to watch", that is one of ten Olympians, selected from all sports, to keep an eye on during the 2020 Olympic Games.

2020 Summer Olympics 

On day three of the 2020 Summer Olympics in Tokyo, Japan, and postponed to 2021 due to the COVID-19 pandemic, Huske competed in the 100m butterfly final.  The race would end up being the fastest 100m butterfly heat in history. Four of the eight finalists swam times which were ranked in the top ten for a female in the All-time history of the event.  Huske finished that 100m butterfly heat in fourth, 1/100th of a second behind bronze medalist Emma McKeon of Australia., and just 14/100ths of a second behind Maggie Macneil who won the gold medal in 55.59. 

In the final of the 4×100m mixed medley relay on day eight, Huske and her finals relay teammates of Ryan Murphy, Lydia Jacoby, and Caeleb Dressel placed fifth. On the ninth and final day of competitive swimming at the Olympic Games, Huske competed in the 4×100m medley relay final for Team USA with teammates Regan Smith, Lydia Jacoby, and Abbey Weitzeil. Team USA finished second with a time of 3:51.73, just 0.13 seconds behind Australia's Olympic-record time of 3:51.60, earning Huske a silver medal.

2021–2022 Fall Collegiate Season
Kick starting her collegiate career, Huske became the first collegiate swimmer to sign an official, professional, sponsorship deal with TYR Sport, Inc., a swimwear company, announcing the partnership in mid-August 2021. Huske made her collegiate debut on October 1 in a dual meet against San Jose State University, winning the 500-yard freestyle in a time of 4:51.33 and the 50-yard freestyle with a time of 22.58 seconds for her school, Stanford University. In the second dual meet of her career against Utah in Salt Lake City, Torri finished 2nd in the 200 butterfly to teammate Lillie Nordmann with a time of 2:02.97.  Later that meet, she won both the 100 free (50.67) and the 200 individual medley.

On the first day, November 18th, of her first collegiate invitational, the 2021 North Carolina State Fall Invitational, Huske won the 200-yard individual medley with a time of 1:52.82, won the 50-yard freestyle in 21.70 seconds, and helped her relay finish second in the 4x50-yard freestyle relay. The next day, Huske helped her relay place second in the 4x50-yard medley relay, won the 100-yard butterfly in 50.30 seconds, and helped her relay win the 4x200-yard freestyle relay event by splitting a 1:42.59 lead-off leg. The third and final day of competition, Huske brought her tally of event wins to six and tally of first or second place finishes to eight by winning the 100-yard freestyle with a time of 47.39 seconds and helping win the 4x100-yard freestyle relay, splitting a 46.27 for the fourth leg of the relay.

2021 World Short Course Championships

On October 28th, Huske was named to the 2021 World Short Course Championships team for the United States in four individual events, while the announcement of the team, including Huske, was ranked by Swimming World as number two for the week's "The Week That Was" honor. She entered to compete in the 100 meter freestyle, 50 meter butterfly, and 100 meter butterfly individual events.

Day one of competition, December 16th, Huske anchored the 4×100m freestyle relay in 53.01 seconds in the prelims heats, helping qualify the relay to the final ranked second behind the Netherlands relay team. In the final, Abbey Weitzeil substituted in for Huske and the relay won a gold medal in a time of 3:28.52 with Huske receiving a gold medal for her prelims contributions as well. The next day, Huske finished third in her heat of the prelims in the 100m freestyle with a 53.34 and qualified for the semifinals ranked eighth overall. In the same prelims session, she split a 24.23 on the anchor leg of the 4×50m mixed freestyle relay to help advance it to the final ranked fourth. For the finals relay, Kate Douglass substituted in for Huske and the relay placed fourth. Huske, qualified for the final of the 100m freestyle in the evening, swimming a 52.48 and ranking seventh overall.

The morning of day three, Huske swam in lane seven in prelims heat seven and qualified for the semifinals of the 50 meter butterfly ranking seventh with a 25.43. In the evening, she placed sixth in the final of the 100 meter freestyle in 51.93 seconds. Huske also qualified for the final of the 50 meter butterfly, tying in rank for fifth overall in the semifinals with Arina Surkova of Russia and Claire Curzan at 25.20 seconds. In the final of the 50 meter butterfly on day four Huske placed fourth, finishing less than four-tenths of a second behind bronze medalist and teammate Claire Curzan. The following morning, Huske qualified for the semifinals of the 100 meter butterfly with a 56.59 in the prelims that ranked her fourth overall. In the 4×200 metre freestyle relay, Huske led-off the relay in 1:56.41 to help qualify the relay to the final ranking second. In the evening, Huske swam a 56.13 in the semifinals of the 100 meter butterfly and qualified for the final ranking fourth. She split a 1:54.72 for the first leg of the 4×200 metre freestyle relay in the final, helping win the silver medal in a time of 7:36.53.

The final day of competition, day six, Huske helped qualify the 4×50 meter freestyle relay to the final ranking first with a split of 24.44 for the second leg of the relay in the prelims heats. In her second event of the morning, Huske split a 58.81 for the butterfly leg of the 4×100 meter medley relay, helping qualify the relay for the final ranking fourth. Huske was substituted out on the finals relay for the 4×50 meter freestyle relay in the evening and won a gold medal for her prelims contributions when the finals relay finished first. For the final of the 100 meter butterfly she swam a 55.75 and finished fourth behind teammate and bronze medalist Claire Curzan. In the final of the 4×100 meter medley relay, Claire Curzan substituted in for Huske on the butterfly leg of the relay and the relay placed fourth.

2022

2021–2022 Winter Collegiate Season 
In January of 2022 the Stanford Women’s Swim and Dive Team traveled to Arizona for back-to-back meets against Arizona State and Arizona.  In the meet against Arizona State on January 21st, Huske began the meet by winning the 1,000 freestyle (9:51.06), before also winning the 50 freestyle (22.79) and the 200 individual medley (1:58.16).   The next day against Arizona Huske finished 3rd in the 200 free (1:49.07) before swimming exhibition races in the 100 freestyle (49.79) and the 100 butterfly (53.19).  Stanford finished January by traveling to Los Angeles, CA for back-to-back meets against U.C.L.A and U.S.C. On January 28th, Huske won the 200 butterfly (1:59.22) and the 100 fly (53.19).  The following day against U.S.C. Huske finished 2nd in the 200 freestyle (1:45.84), the 100 free (49.06) and the 200 individual medley (1:58.26).  Stanford finished up the dual meet season by traveling to Berkeley, CA for a meet against Cal. During the meet Huske won the 50 freestyle (22.28) and the 100 butterfly (51.92).

2022 Pac-12 Championships
The first day of the 2022 Pac-12 Conference Championships, Huske helped achieve a first-place finish in the 4×200 yard freestyle relay with a 6:50.21, swimming a personal best time of 1:42.51 for the lead-off leg of the relay. The second day, she won the 200 yard individual medley with a 1:52.42 and helped win the 4×50 yard freestyle relay, splitting a 21.43 for the first 50-yard portion of the relay. In her first event of the third day, Huske won the 100 yard butterfly in 49.43 seconds, finishing 0.44 seconds ahead of second-place finisher Regan Smith. For the 4×100 yard medley relay, her second and final event of the evening's finals session, she helped the Stanford relay team achieve the conference title in the event with a final time of 3:25.54, splitting a 50.28 for the butterfly leg of the relay. Huske achieved her first win of the fourth and final day in the 100 yard freestyle, finishing 0.27 seconds head of the second-place finisher with a time of 47.07 seconds. Her second win of the day was in the 4×100 yard freestyle relay, where she anchored the relay to a first-place finish in 3:09.06 with a 46.72.  For her performance during the meet, Huske was named the Swimmer of the Meet by the Pac-12.

2022 NCAA Championships
At the 2022 NCAA Championships in Atlanta, Huske started competition on day one with a win in the 4×200 yard freestyle relay, where she helped achieve a new pool record time of 6:48.30 with her split of 1:41.93 for the lead-off leg of the relay. In the morning of day two, she qualified for the final of the 200 yard individual medley ranking second with a time of 1:54.05. For the evening finals session, she achieved a second-place finish in the 200 yard individual medley in 1:51.81 and a sixth-place finish in the 4×50 yard freestyle relay, splitting a 21.76 for the lead-off leg of the relay. The following day, she placed second in the 100 yard butterfly behind only Kate Douglass with a time of 49.17 seconds. In the final of the 4×100 yard medley relay later in the same session, she split a 50.01 for the butterfly leg of the relay to contribute to a third-place finish in 3:25.63. On the final day of competition, she won the b-final of the 100 yard freestyle with a 46.98 and led-off the 4×100 yard freestyle relay in 46.82 seconds to help achieve a second-place finish in 3:08.97.

2022 International Team Trials 
In late April of 2022 the International Team Trials were held in Greensboro, NC to select Team USA for the 2022 Fina LC World Championships to be held in Budapest, Hungary in June. Just a little over three weeks before the meet Huske contracted COVID, forcing her out of the pool, requiring rest, and putting her participation at the Trials at risk. Fortunately, Huske recovered quickly and participated fully at the meet. 

On the first day of the competition, Huske began mornings preliminary session by finishing 2nd in the 100M freestyle to Natalie Hinds with a time of 54.16. Later that day in finals, Huske secured a spot on the Team USA’s World Championship team by winning the 100M freestyle with a time of 53.35 ahead of Claire Curzan who placed second with a time of 53.58. In prelims on day two of the competition Huske finished 10th in the 200M freestyle with a time of 1:59.14. She also swam prelims in the 50M butterfly where she finished fourth with a time of 25.98. Later that day in finals she finished 2nd in the 50M butterfly with a time of 25.68, just behind Claire Curzan time of 25.49. On the third day of the competition Huske place first in prelims of the 100Mbutterfly with a time of 57.03. In finals, Huske won her second final of the competition by winning the 100M butterfly with a time of 56.28 to finish ahead of Claire Curzan who placed 2nd with a time of 56.25. On the final morning of the competition Huske finished 5th in the prelims of the 50M freestyle with a time of 24.76. In finals, Huske won her third event of the meet when she won the 50M free with a time of 24.50 just 2/100’s of a second ahead of Erika Brown who finished 2nd with a time of 24.52.

2022 FINA (LC) World Championships 

On the morning of the first day of competition at the Fina LC World Championships held in Budapest, Hungary Huske swam prelims of the 100M butterfly finishing 1st with a time of 56.82.   In the evening session Huske swam the 100M butterfly again and placed first in semi-finals with a time of 56.29.  Later that night she swam the lead-off leg of the women’s 4x100 freestyle relay with a time of 52.96. Huske won her first bronze of the meet when U.S. placed 3rd in this race with an overall time of 3:32.58.  With her time in this race, Huske became the 3rd fastest woman in American history, and one of only four American women ever to go under 53 seconds in the 100M freestyle, the others being Simone Manuel, Mallroy Comerford, and Abbey Weitzeil.

The next day, the second of the meet, Huske won her first gold medal of the meet by placing 1st in the 100M butterfly with a time of 55.64, a half a second in front of second place finisher Marie Wattel of France. With this finish Huske became the 4th fastest women in World history and she also broke her own American record which she set a year earlier at the U.S. Olympic Trials in Omaha, Nebraska.

On the fourth day of the meet Huske earned her second gold medal when she swam the fly leg of the 4x100M mixed medley relay. Her split of 56.17 was the fastest female fly split by over a second and it helped the U.S. win with a time of 3:38.79, which was more than two and a half seconds in front of the 2nd place Australian team which finished with a time of 3:41.34.

On day five of the competition Huske started off swimming in the mornings prelim session by finishing 3rd in the 100M freestyle with a time of 53.72.  In semi-finals later that night she again finished 3rd with a time of 53.04.

Day six began for Huske in the morning where she swam prelims in the 50M butterfly. She finished 10th in prelims with a time of 26.10 making it through to semi-finals.  Later that night Huske swam the first race of the evening and won her second bronze of the meet when she finished 3rd in the 100M freestyle with a time of 52.92 behind Mollie O’Callahan of Australia and Sarah Sjostrom of Sweden.  A bit later in the session Huske swam in the semi-final of the 50M butterfly where she finished 2nd in a time of 25.38 breaking the Americas and American record of 25.48 formerly owned by Kelsi Dahlia.

Huske started off swimming prelims in the morning session of day seven when she swam the 50M freestyle, finishing 8th with a time of 24.91.   In Huske’s first race of the evening session she swam the 50M butterfly final where she finished 5th with a time of 25.45.  To complete a busy evening session with three events, Huske swam in the 4x100 freestyle relay earning her third bronze of the meet. Huske swam the third leg of the relay with a time of 52.50.   

On the eighth and last day of the meet Huske swam two events in finals, the 50M freestyle where she finished 6th with a time of 24.64.   Huske then completed her meet in the last race of the entire meet, the women’s 4x100 medley relay. She earned her third gold medal when she helped the U.S. team by splitting 56.67 on the butterfly leg. 

During the meet Huske swam a total of 16 races making her the busiest swimmer of the meet.  With her medal count at the 2022 World Championships, Huske became one of only four American women in history to win six medals in a World Championship, the others being Katie Ledecky, Missy Franklin and Simone Manuel.  In addition, for her performance named Ultra Swimmer of the Month for June of 2022.

2022–2023 Fall Collegiate Season 
Huske started her sophomore competition season on October 13th, 2022 in a home dual meet against Utah. She started off the meet by swimming freestyle anchor as part of a winning 4x50 y medley relay team which went 1:39.93.  In her second race of the meet, Huske faced Freshman phenom Clair Curzan in the 100y backstroke where she narrowly defeated the 2022 LC World Championships bronze medal winner in the event by .02 with a time of 52.62.   In her third race of the competition Huske won the 200Y breaststroke with a time of 2:14.65.  Huske capped off the competition by swimming the third leg of the winning 4x100 freestyle relay team where she split 51.29 and the team swam 3:20.46.   Huske missed Stanford’s second dual of the year against Washington State at Washington due to sickness.  In Huske’s second dual meet of the year, Stanford faced San Jose State at San Jose State on November 4th.  Huske began the competition by swimming the backstroke lead off leg with a split of 25.01 on the winning 4x50y medley relay which finished with a time of 1:41.07.  She followed-up the relay by finishing second in the 200y freestyle with a time of 1:48.80 before winning the 100y butterfly with a time of 53.72.

In Stanford’s first suited meet of the year Stanford traveled to Greensboro, North Carolina for The NC State/GAC Invite which was held from November 17th-19th.  In finals on day one of the competition Huske began the meet by swimming the leadoff leg of the 4x50y freestyle relay. She posted a time of 21.54 for Stanford’s winning relay which finished in 1:25.09.  Huske’s time and the team’s time were faster than the NCAA A standard, and qualified both Huske and team for the NCAA Championship meet.   In addition, Stanford’s time in the relay was the fastest time in the NCAA for the fall season.  In Huske’s second finals swim of the day she posted a time of 1:53.37 in the 200y individual medley while winning and posting the falls fastest time in the event.  With just the men’s 200y individual medley in between her first two races, and swimming on less that twenty minutes rest, Huske swam her third finals event of the day finishing second in the 50y freestyle with an NCAA A qualifying time of 21.63.  Huske capped off her first day of finals, by swimming a 49.38 split in the butterfly leg on Stanford’s winning 4x100y medley relay which posted a time of 3:26.97.  Stanford’s time in the relay earned it another NCAA A cut.   On the second day of the competition, Huske led off finals by swimming the backstroke leg of the 4x50y medley relay with a time of 23.82.  Stanford placed second in the event, again earning and NCAA A cut with an overall time of 1:34.37.  Later in the second day of finals Huske swam won the 100y butterfly with a time of 49.25.  This time not only earned her another NCAA A cut, but it was also the fastest fall time in the NCAA, and fastest time in history in a non-NCAA Championship meet.   In her last finals race of the second day, Huske swam the leadoff leg of the 4x200y relay with a time of 1:44.25 as Stanford finished first with an overall time of 1:45.38.  Again, Stanford’s performance in this event was the top fall time in the NCAA and it earned Stanford an A cut in the NCAA Championship meet while Huske earned a B cut in the individual 200 freestyle of the NCAA Championship meet.  On the third and last day of finals, Huske first race was the 100y freestyle where she won the event, while again posting an NCAA top fall time of 46.85, and earning yet another NCAA A cut.

In the final women’s event of the meet, Huske swam anchor on the Women’s 4x100Y freestyle relay.  She posted a split of 46.96 and Stanford won the event with a top fall time in the NCAA with time of 3:10.72.  Over the course of the NCAA/GAC Invite Huske earned six NCAA top times, three individual  (100Y free, 100Y butterfly, and 200Y individual medley) and three relay (5x50 freestyle relay, 4x100 freestyle relay, and 4x200 freestyle relay).  In addition, during the meet she qualified for her four individual NCAA A cuts (50 freestyle, 100 freestyle, 100 butterfly, 200 individual medley) and one NCAA B cut (200 freestyle).

2022 FINA Short Course World Championships (25 m) 

On October 19th Huske was named to the 2022 World Swimming Short Course Championships team for the United States in three individual events (100m freestyle, 50m butterfly and 100m butterfly).  On the morning of the first day of competition, December 13th, at the Fina SC World Championships held in Melbourne, Australia, Huske began the mornings’ preliminary session by finishing fourth in the 50m butterfly with a time of 25.11.   Later that morning during the preliminary session Huske anchored the women’s 4x100m freestyle relay with a time of 52.74.  The United States finished fourth in the relay with a time of 3:31.11.  In the evening session Huske won her semifinal heat and finished third overall in the 50m butterfly with a time of 24.86.  Later in the evening session Huske earned her first medal of the meet (silver) when she led off in the finals of the women’s 4x100m freestyle relay with a time of 51.73.  This split was the fastest lead off split in the race.  The United States team (Huske, Kate Douglass, Claire Curzan and Erika Brown) finished second while setting a new American record with a time of 3:26.29.  In the morning of the second day of competition Huske swam the 100m freestyle and finished sixth with a time of 52.48.  Later on the second day, Huske won her second medal, and first gold medal of the meet when she swam in the 4x50m mixed medley where she swam the freestyle leg anchoring the relay which posted a time of 23.73.  The Americans (Ryan Murphy, Nic Fink, Huske and Kate Douglass ) won the race while breaking the World, Championship and American records with a time 1:35.15.  After just one race (men’s 800m freestyle, Huske swam the semifinal in the 100m freestyle.   She swam in the first heat and moved on to finals by finishing sixth in semifinals with a time of 52.11.  In total, Huske swam three events in the evening of her busiest day of the competition.  She capped off the evening of the second day by swimming the final of the women’s 50m butterfly.  Huske won her second gold and third medal of the meet tying Maggie MacNeil with a time of 24.64.  On the third day of the competition, Huske swam in the evening sessions first event, the finals of the 100m freestyle where she finished fifth with a time of 52.04.  Later in the evening session, the Huske again won her third gold medal and fourth medal of the meet when she again led off finals in a relay with a time of 24.08 in the women’s 4x50m freestyle relay.  The Americans team (Huske, Claire Curzan, Erika Brown and Kate Douglass) not only earned gold but also set new Championship and American records with a time of 1:33.89.  On Saturday morning of the fifth day of the competition, Huske finished second in prelims of the 100m butterfly with a time of 56.01.  Later that night in the first race of the evening, Huske won a silver medal, her fifth medal of the competition when she swam the butterfly leg of the women’s 4x50m medley relay in a time of 24.94.  The American team (Claire Curzan, Lilly King, Huske and Kate Douglass) won the silver medal in a time of 1:42.41.   Later that night during the evening session, swimming in lane four of heat one of semifinals.  Huske won her heat and finished first overall in the 100m butterfly with a time of 55.23.   On Sunday, the sixth and last day of the competition, Huske was in the first race of the evening session, the 100m butterfly.  She won her third silver, and sixth medal of the competition while finishing second with a time of 54.75.  The second to the last race of the meet was a showdown between the Americans and the Australians in the women’s 4x100m medley relay.  Huske won her fourth gold and seventh medal of the competition when she swam in the women’s 4x100m medley relay.  As she had done in the mixed 4x50 medley relay and the women’s 4x50m medley relay, Huske swam the butterfly leg and split 54.53.  The American team (Claire Curzan, Lilly King, Huske and Kate Douglass) not only won gold in the event, but they also set World, Championship and American records with a time of 3:44.35.  

Over the course of the six-day competition, Huske won seven medals, four golds and three silvers.  No woman in the competition won more medals than did Huske.  In addition, Huske was part of two World Records and four American records over the course of the meet.

During the course of the two Fina Swimming World Championships held in 2022, long course (held in Budapest, Hungary) and short course (held in Melbourne Australia) Huske won a total of thirteen medals (seven gold, three silvers and three bronzes), more than any woman in the World.  In addition, during those meets she was part of two World Records and Six American Records.

World records

Short Course (25 m)

Continental and national records

Long course meters (50 m) US National Records (NR)

Short Course meters (25 m) US National Records (NR)

Personal Bests

Long Course (50 m)

Short Course (25 m)

Short Course (25 y)

U.S Olympic Trials and International Team Trials (50 m)

International Championships (50 m)

Awards and honors
 Pac-12 Conference, Swimmer of the Meet: 2022 Women's Pac-12 Conference Championships
 Pac-12 Conference, Swimmer of the Month (female): November 2021
 Swimming World, The Week That Was: November 1, 2021 (#2)
 SwimSwam, Top 100 (Women's): 2022 (#21)
 SwimSwam, Swammy Award, Age Group Swimmer of the Year 17–18 (female): 2021
 SwimSwam, Swammy Award, Age Group Swimmer of the Year 15–16 (female): 2019
 USA Today, 10 to watch: 2020 Summer Olympics
 USA Swimming, Scholastic All-American: 4 time recipient (2017–2021)
 National Interscholastic Swimming Coaches Association (NISCA), Academic All-American High School Swimmer: 2020–2021
 Washington Post, Swimmer of the Year: 2018 & 2019
 Swimming World, High School Swimmer of the Year: 2019 & 2021
 Ultra Swim, Ultra Swim Swimmer of the Month: June 2021 
 USA Today, High School Swimmer of the Year: 2021
 SwimSwam, SwimSwams Top 100 for 2022 (#21)
 College Swimming Coaches Association of America (CSCAA), Division I All-American (6 events)
 Swimming World, Pre-World Championships Rankings: The Top 25 Female swimmers in the World (#18) 
 Stanford, Stanford Conference Athlete of the Year, Women’s Swimming and Diving: 2022
 SwimSwam. Top 15 Women of the 2022 Fina World Championships (#4)
 Ultra Swim, Ultra Swim Swimmer of the Month: June 2022
 The Athletic. College Sports 40 Under 40-Top Young Coaches, Players and Execs, Influencers changing the game (Only swimmer named): August 23, 2022

See also
 List of World Swimming Championships (25 m) medalists (women)

References

External links
 
 

Living people
2002 births
American female swimmers
American female butterfly swimmers
Swimmers at the 2020 Summer Olympics
Medalists at the 2020 Summer Olympics
Olympic silver medalists for the United States in swimming
People from Arlington County, Virginia
Stanford Cardinal women's swimmers
Medalists at the FINA World Swimming Championships (25 m)
World Aquatics Championships medalists in swimming
21st-century American women
Yorktown High School (Virginia) alumni